The red-fronted serin or fire-fronted serin (Serinus pusillus) is a small passerine bird in the finch family Fringillidae.  It prefers high mountain regions and is 11–12 cm long.

This bird breeds in the Caucasus and the higher mountains of Turkey and Iran, with vagrants occasionally reaching the Greek Eastern Aegean Islands in winter. This bird is also found in Ladakh and other parts of the Indian Himalayas. Outside the breeding season, it occurs in small flocks, typically seen searching through thistle patches. It is a popular cagebird, and escapees from captivity are occasionally found throughout Europe.

The bird is variable in plumage, with adults resembling very dark redpolls. The foreparts are sooty and the forehead is red; juveniles have buff-brown heads. The call is a rapid, shrill "titihihihihihi", resembling that of a Linnet.

The bird will breed in captivity and thrives on a diet of canary grass seed, millet, and other small seeds. They bathe daily if water is accessible.

Phylogeny 
This species is phylogeneticagy included within the group of Serinus syriacus now thriving around Mt. Lebanon and other Asian and African patches in winter, together with Serinus canicollis (African distribution) and Serinus alario (southern tip of Africa distribution) Arnaiz-Villena et al., 1999

References

External links
 Red-fronted serin From Turkey

red-fronted serin
Birds of Azerbaijan
Birds of Western Asia
Birds of Central Asia
Birds of Afghanistan
Birds of North India
Birds of Western China
red-fronted serin